Uruguayan singer Natalia Oreiro has been featured in over twenty music videos. From her self-titled debut album Natalia Oreiro (1998), she released music videos for the singles "Que sí, que sí", "De tu amor", "Cambio dolor", and "Me muero de amor".

Music videos

Filmography

Film

Short film

Television

Fictions

Programs

References 

Videographies_of_Uruguayan_artists